The George Enescu Philharmonic Orchestra is a musical institution located in Bucharest, Romania.

Founded on 7 May 1868 under the supervision of Eduard Wachman, the Romanian Philharmonic Society had as purpose the creation of a permanent symphonic orchestra in Bucharest. Its first concert took place on 15 December of the same year.

After the palace of the Romanian Athenaeum was built in 1888, the orchestra inaugurated that building with a concert on March 5, 1889, and the Athenaeum became the new home of the orchestra, as it has remained ever since.

Wachman, who conducted the first permanent orchestra until 1907, was followed by Dimitrie Dinicu (1868–1936), and himself was followed as the principal conductor, starting in 1920, by George Georgescu, a student of both Arthur Nikisch and George Enescu.

After World War II, the institution diversified its activity by creating the Academic Choir, a nucleus of soloists (such as Maria Kardas Barna who was a permanent piano soloist until 1971), and several chamber ensembles. After the death of George Enescu in 1955, the Philharmonic was renamed George Enescu Philharmonic Orchestra in his honour. Likewise, the Orchestra is, by tradition, the first to play at the George Enescu Festival.

The Philharmonic's principal conductors have included Constantin Silvestri, Mircea Basarab, Dumitru Capoianu, Ion Voicu, Mihai Brediceanu, and Cristian Mandeal. Since 2010, the general director has been Andrei Dimitriu and, as of 2015, the artistic director is the pianist Nicolae Licaret.

Founded in 2010, the George Enescu Foundation aims to support, promote and integrate Romanian Culture into the international artistic circuit.

See also 
 Romanian Athenaeum

References

Works cited

External links
  George Enescu Philharmonic –  Official Website 
 George Enescu Foundation – Official Website 

Romanian orchestras
Musical groups established in 1886